There are many sushi and sashimi ingredients, some traditional and some contemporary.

Sushi styles

 Chirashi-zushi (ちらし寿司, scattered sushi) is a bowl of sushi rice topped with a variety of raw fish and vegetables/garnishes (also refers to barazushi)
 Inari-zushi (稲荷寿司, fried tofu pouch) is a type of sushi served in a seasoned and fried pouch made of tofu and filled with sushi rice.
 Maki-zushi (巻き寿司, rolled sushi) consists of rice and other ingredients rolled together with a sheet of nori.
 Chu maki (中巻き, medium roll) is a medium-sized rolled maki sushi usually containing several ingredients
 Futo maki (太巻き, large or fat roll) is a thick rolled maki sushi containing multiple ingredients
 Gunkan maki (軍艦巻, battleship roll) is a type of sushi consisting of a rice ball wrapped in a sheet of nori which extends in a cylinder upward to hold a loose topping such as fish eggs
 Hoso maki (細巻き, thin roll) is thinly rolled maki sushi with only one ingredient
 Kazari maki (飾り巻き寿司, flower or decorative roll) is a type of sushi designed frequently with colored rice into simple or complex shapes.
 Temaki (手巻き, hand roll) is a cone-shaped maki sushi
 Nigiri sushi (握り寿司, hand-formed sushi) consists of an oval-shaped ball of rice topped with a slice of another item
 Oshi sushi (押し寿司, "pressed sushi"), also known as hako-zushi (箱寿司, "box sushi"), is formed by molding the rice and toppings in a rectangular box, then slicing into blocks.
 Uramaki (うらまき, inside-out roll) is a contemporary style of Maki-zushi that is described as a roll that is inside out—with the rice on the outside—and has an outer layer of tobiko or sesame seeds.

Wrappings
 Nori (海苔): dried seaweed (often used to wrap or belt makizushi or gunkan)
 Rice paper
 Salmon skin
 Thinly sliced sheets of cucumber
 Usuyaki-tamago: thinly cooked sweet omelette or custard
 Yuba:  "tofu skin" or "soybean skin", a thin film derived from soybeans

Eggs

 Tamago (卵, 玉子): sweet egg omelette or custard, sometimes mixed with minced fish 
 Quail eggs (raw or cooked)

Meats
 Basashi/sakura niku (馬刺し/馬肉): Raw horse, nicknamed for its bright pink color
 Gyusashi (牛刺し): Raw Beef
 Shikasashi (鹿刺し): Raw Venison
 Torisashi (鳥刺し): Raw chicken

Seafood
All seafoods in this list are served raw unless otherwise specified.

Finfish
The list below does not follow biological classification.

 Ainame (アイナメ): fat greenling
 Aji (鯵): Japanese jack mackerel
 Akami (赤身): red meat fish
 Akamutsu (アカムツ): blackthroat seaperch
 Aka-yagara (赤矢柄): red cornetfish
 Amadai (あまだい): tilefish
 Anago (穴子): saltwater eel, Conger eel
 Ankimo (鮟肝): monkfish liver (cooked)
 Ayu (鮎): sweetfish (raw or grilled)
 Buri (鰤): adult yellowtail (cooked or raw) 
 Hamachi (魬, はまち): young (35–60 cm) yellowtail

 Dojo (ドジョウ): Japanese loach
 Ei (エイ): skate
 Engawa (縁側): often referred as 'fluke fin', the chewy part of fluke, a flatfish
 Fugu (河豚): puffer fish
 Funa (フナ): crucian carp
 Gindara (銀鱈): sablefish
 Hamo (鱧, はも): daggertooth pike conger
 Hata (ハタ): grouper
 Hatahata (鰰): sandfish
 Hikari-mono (光り物): blue-backed fish, various kinds of "shiny" (silvery scales) fish 
 Hiramasa (平政, 平柾): yellowtail amberjack (Seriola lalandi)
 Hirame (平目, 鮃): fluke, a type of flounder
 Hokke (ホッケ): Okhotsk atka mackerel
 Hoshigarei (干鰈): spotted halibut
 Inada (鰍): very young yellowtail
 Isake (いさけ): trumpeter
 Isaki (伊佐木, いさき): striped pigfish
 Ishigarei (石鰈): stone flounder
 Iwana (イワナ): charr
 Iwashi (鰯): sardine
 Kajiki (梶木, 舵木, 旗魚): swordfish
 Makajiki (真梶木): blue marlin
 Mekajiki (目梶木): swordfish
 Kanpachi (間八): greater amberjack, Seriola dumerili
 Karei (鰈): flatfish
 Katsuo (鰹, かつお): skipjack tuna 
 Kawahagi (皮剥ぎ): Filefish
 Kibinago (黍魚子): banded blue sprat, or silver-stripe round herring
 Kisu (鱚): sillago
 Kochi (こち): flathead
 Kohada (小鰭): Japanese gizzard shad

 Shinko (新子): very young gizzard shad
 Konoshiro (鰶): fully matured gizzard shad
 Kue (クエ): longtooth grouper
 Madai (まだい): red sea bream
 Maguro (鮪): Thunnus (a genus of tuna) 
 Chūtoro (中とろ): medium-fat bluefin tuna belly
 Kuro (maguro) (くろまぐろ): bluefin tuna, the fish itself
 Kihada (maguro) (木肌鮪, 黄肌鮪, きはだ): yellowfin tuna
 Mebachi (maguro) (めばちまぐろ): bigeye tuna, the most widely distributed fish in Japan
 Meji (maguro) (メジ鮪): young Pacific bluefin tuna
 Ōtoro (大とろ): fattiest portion of bluefin tuna belly
 Shiro maguro (白鮪), Binnaga/Bincho (鬢長): albacore or "white" tuna
 Toro (とろ): fatty bluefin tuna belly
 Makogarei (まこがれい): marbled flounder
 Mamakari (飯借): sprat
 Matou-dai (まとう-だい): John Dory
 Masu (鱒): Trout
 Mejina (メジナ): Girella
 Nijimasu (虹鱒): Rainbow trout
 Nishin (ニシン): Herring
 Noresore (のれそれ): baby Anago
 Ohyou (大鮃): halibut
 Okoze (虎魚): Okoze stonefish
 Saba (鯖): chub mackerel or blue mackerel Served raw or marinated
 Sake, Shake (鮭): Salmon
 Sanma (秋刀魚): Pacific saury (autumn) or mackerel pike
 Sawara (鰆): Spanish mackerel
 Sayori (針魚, 鱵): halfbeak (springtime)
 Shima-aji (しま鯵): white trevally
 Shirauo (しらうお): whitebait (Springtime)
 Shiromi (白身) seasonal "white meat" fish
 Suzuki (鱸): sea bass
 Seigo (鮬): young (1-2 y.o.) sea bass
 Tachiuo (タチウオ): beltfish

 Tai (鯛): seabream snapper 
 Madai (真鯛): red sea bream
 Kasugo (春子鯛): young sea bream
 Kurodai (黒鯛): snapper
 Ibodai (疣鯛): Japanese butterfish
 Kinmedai (金目鯛): splendid alfonsino
 Tara (鱈): Cod
 Unagi (鰻): freshwater eel, often broiled (grilled) with a sweet sauce. The preparation of unagi is referred to as kabayaki.

Inkfish
 Aori ika (あおりいか): Bigfin reef squid
 Hotaru ika (ホタルイカ): Firefly squid
 Ika (烏賊, いか): Cuttlefish or Squid, served raw or cooked
 Sumi ika (墨, すみいか): Japanese spineless cuttlefish
 Tako (蛸, たこ): Octopus
 Yari ika (ヤリイカ): Spear squid

Others

 Hoya (海鞘, ホヤ): Sea pineapple, an Ascidian
 Kamesashi (かめさし): Sea turtle sashimi
 Kurage (水母, 海月): Jellyfish
 Kujira (鯨, くじら, クジラ): Whale
 Namako (海鼠, なまこ): Sea cucumber
 Shiokara (塩辛): Seasoned, salted entrails; frequently squid
 Hitode (ヒトデ): Starfish
 Uni: (雲丹, 海胆) gonad of sea urchin; may come in different colors

Roe

Roe is a mass of fish eggs:

 Caviar (キャビア): roe of sturgeon.
 Ikura (イクラ): Salmon roe
 Sujiko (筋子): Salmon roe (still in the sac)
 Kazunoko (数の子, 鯑): Herring roe
 Masago (まさご): Smelt roe
 Mentaiko (明太子): Pollock roe seasoned to have a spicy flavor

 Shirako (白子): Milt
 Tarako (たらこ, 鱈子): Alaska pollock roe
 Tobiko (飛子): roe of Flying fish

Seaweed
 Kombu (昆布): Kelp, many preparations
 Wakame (若布): Edible seaweed, sea mustard

Shellfish

 Akagai (赤貝): Ark shell
 Ama-ebi (甘海老): raw pink shrimp Pandalus borealis
 Aoyagi (青柳): Trough shell
 Asari (あさり): Japanese carpet shell
 Awabi (鮑): Abalone
 Botan-ebi (ぼたんえび): Botan shrimp
 Dungeness crab
 Ebi (海老): boiled or raw shrimp
 Hamaguri (蛤): Clam, Meretrix lusoria
 Himejako (ヒメジャコ): Giant clam
 Himo (紐): "fringe" around an Akagai
 Hokkigai, Hokki (ホッキ貝, 北寄貝): Surf clam
 Hotategai, Hotate (帆立貝, 海扇): Scallop
 Ise-ebi (伊勢海老): a Spiny lobster, Panulirus japonicus
 Kaibashira (貝柱), Hashira (柱): valve muscles of Scallop or Shellfish
 Kani (蟹): Crab, also refers to imitation crab
 Kani-miso (カニミソ): Crab offal paste
 Kaki (カキ,牡蠣): Oyster
 Kegani (ケガニ): hairy crab
 Kuruma-ebi (車海老): Prawn species Marsupenaeus japonicus
 Makigai (マキガイ): Conch
 Mategai (マテ貝): Razor clam
 Matsubagani (松葉蟹): Champagne crab or regionally, Snow crab
 Mirugai (海松貝): Geoduck clam
 Sazae (栄螺, さざえ): Horned turban shell
 Shako (蝦蛄): Mantis shrimp or "Squilla"
 Shiba ebi (芝海老): Grey prawn
 Shima ebi (しまえび): Morotoge shrimp
 Soft-shell crab
 Tarabagani (鱈場蟹): King crab
 Tairagai (タイラギ): Pen-shell clam
 Torigai (鳥貝): Cockle
 Tsubugai (螺貝, ツブガイ): Whelk (Neptunea, Buccinum, Babylonia japonica)
 Zuwaigani (ズワイガニ/津和井蟹/松葉蟹), also regionally marketed as matsubagani: Snow crab

Vegetables/Fruit

 Asparagus (アスパラガス).
 Avocado (アボカド). 
 Carrot (ニンジン): a julienne of carrot
 Cucumber (キュウリ): a julienne of cucumber
 Eggplant (ナス): served in small slices, coated with oil.
 Ginger (しょうが): most often used is pickled ginger: beni shōga and gari
 Gobō (牛蒡): Burdock root
 Kaiware (かいわれ大根): Daikon radish sprouts
 Kanpyō (乾瓢, 干瓢): dried gourd
 Kappamaki (河童巻き): a makizushi made of cucumber and named after the Japanese water spirit who loves cucumber (Kappa)
 Konnyaku (蒟蒻): Cake made from the corm of the Konjac plant.
 Nattō (納豆): fermented soybeans
 Negi (ネギ): Japanese bunching onion
 Oshinko (漬物): Takuan (pickled daikon) or other pickled vegetable
 Shiitake (シイタケ): dried shiitake mushrooms, served roasted or simmered
 Takuan (沢庵漬け): pickled daikon radish
 Tofu (豆腐): Soybean curd
 Tsukemono (漬物): various pickled vegetables
 Umeboshi (梅干し): pickled plum
 Wasabi (山葵, わさび): paste of wasabi root
 Yam (サツマイモ):
 Yuba (ゆば): Tofu skin

See also

 List of condiments
 List of Japanese condiments
 List of Japanese cooking utensils
 List of Japanese dishes

References

External links

 Secrets of Sushi - Sushi Sauce

Sushi
Sushi